Kyur may refer to:

 Kür, a village in the Shamkir Rayon of Azerbaijan
 KYUR, a television station (virtual channel 13, digital channel 12) licensed to Anchorage, Alaska, United States